Lusakn is a village in the Aragatsavan Municipality of the Aragatsotn Province of Armenia. The population of the village consists of Armenians and Yezidis.

Etymology 
The village was founded in 1983 as "3rd Sovkhoz". The village was renamed as Lusakn in 1993.

References

External links 

Kiesling, Rediscovering Armenia, p. 20, available online at the US embassy to Armenia's website

Populated places in Aragatsotn Province
Yazidis in Armenia